Forkhead box protein C2 (FOXC2) also known as forkhead-related protein FKHL14 (FKHL14), transcription factor FKH-14, or mesenchyme fork head protein 1 (MFH1) is a protein that in humans is encoded by the FOXC2 gene. FOXC2 is a member of the fork head box (FOX) family of transcription factors.

Structure and function
The protein is 501 amino acids in length. The gene has no introns; the single exon is approximately 1.5kb in size.

FOX transcription factors are expressed during development and are associated with a number of cellular and developmental differentiation processes. FOXC2 is required during early development of the kidneys, including differentiation of podocytes and maturation of the glomerular basement membrane. It is also involved in the early development of the heart.

An increased expression of FOXC2 in adipocytes can increase the amount of brown adipose tissue leading to lower weight and an increased sensitivity to insulin.

Role in disease

Absence of FOXC2 has been shown to lead to the failure of lymphatic valves to form and problems with lymphatic remodelling. A number of mutations in the FOXC2 gene have been associated with Lymphedema–distichiasis syndrome, It has also been suggested that there may be a link between polymorphisms in FOXC2 and varicose veins.

FOXC2 is also involved in cancer metastases. In particular, expression of FOXC2 is induced when epithelial cells undergo an epithelial-mesenchymal transition (EMT) and become mesenchymal looking cells. EMT can be induced by a number of genes including Snail, Twist, Goosecoid, and TGF-beta 1. Overexpression of FOXC2 has been noted in subtypes of breast cancer which are highly metastatic. Suppression of FOXC2 expression using shRNA in a highly metastatic breast cancer model blocks their metastatic ability.

References

Further reading

External links
 GeneReviews/NCBI/NIH/UW entry on Lymphedema-Distichiasis Syndrome

Forkhead transcription factors